Waterval Onder is a small village situated at the base of the escarpment on the banks of the Elands River in Emakhazeni Local Municipality, Mpumalanga, South Africa.

History
The name means below the waterfall, due to its position below a 75 m waterfall (Elands River Falls). The village did not develop into a town like its sister town of Waterval Boven, which is above the waterfall. Both settlements were established in 1895 because of the building of the Pretoria - Delagoa Bay railway line built by the Netherlands-South African Railway Company (NZASM).

President Paul Kruger lived in Waterval Onder before he left South Africa via Mozambique during the Anglo-Boer war. His Krugerhof house was proclaimed a national monument.

References

Populated places in the Emakhazeni Local Municipality
Populated places established in 1895
1895 establishments in the South African Republic